John Quillin Tilson (April 5, 1866 – August 14, 1958) was an American politician. A  Republican, he represented Connecticut in the United States House of Representatives for almost 22 years and was House Majority leader for 6 years.

Early life
Tilson was born in Clearbranch, Unicoi County, Tennessee, on April 5, 1866. He attended both public and private schools in nearby Flag Pond and later at Mars Hill, North Carolina. He went to college at Carson–Newman College, in Jefferson City, Tennessee, where he graduated in 1888. Later he enrolled at Yale Law School, where he graduated in 1893. He was admitted to the bar in 1897 and started to practice in New Haven, Connecticut.

In 1898, when the Spanish–American War broke out, he enlisted and served as a second lieutenant in the Sixth Regiment, United States Volunteer Infantry.

Career
In 1904, Tilson was elected to the Connecticut House of Representatives, where he served until 1908, the last two years as speaker. He was later elected to United States House of Representatives, serving from 1909 to 1913; he ran unsuccessfully for reelection in 1912.

Tilson ran for election again and was again reelected to the House of Representatives. He served from March 4, 1915, until his resignation on December 3, 1932. He was the Majority Leader for the 69th Congress, 70th Congress, and the 71st Congress. He became a delegate to the Republican National Convention in 1932.

Later life
After his retirement from public life, Tilson returned to the practice of law in Washington D.C., and then in New Haven, Connecticut. He also served as a special lecturer at Yale University on parliamentary law and procedure and wrote Tilson's Manual.

Death
Tilson died in New London, New Hampshire on August 14, 1958. He is interred at the private burial grounds on the family farm in Clearbranch, Tennessee.

References

External links

The Political Graveyard

1866 births
1958 deaths
Politicians from New Haven, Connecticut
People from Unicoi County, Tennessee
Carson–Newman University alumni
Yale Law School alumni
Majority leaders of the United States House of Representatives
Republican Party members of the Connecticut House of Representatives
Speakers of the Connecticut House of Representatives
Connecticut lawyers
Lawyers from Washington, D.C.
American military personnel of the Spanish–American War
United States Army officers
Republican Party members of the United States House of Representatives from Connecticut
Lawyers from New Haven, Connecticut